The Bishop of Waterford and Lismore is an episcopal title which takes its name after the city of Waterford and town of Lismore in Ireland. The title was used by the Church of Ireland until 1838, and is still used by the Roman Catholic Church.

History
The bishopric is a union of the episcopal sees of Waterford and Lismore which were united by Pope Urban V in 1363. Following the Reformation, there were parallel successions.

In the Church of Ireland the see continued until 1833 when it became part of the archbishopric of Cashel. In 1838, the Anglican province of Cashel lost its metropolitan status and became the bishopric of Cashel and Waterford. It was further united with the Sees of Ossory, Ferns and Leighlin to become the united bishopric of Cashel and Ossory in 1977.

In the Roman Catholic Church the title remains as separate bishopric. The present Incumbent is the Most Reverend Alphonsus Cullinan, Bishop of the Roman Catholic Diocese of Waterford and Lismore, who was appointed by the Holy See on 2 February 2015 and ordained bishop on 12 April 2015.

Pre-Reformation bishops

Bishops during the Reformation

Post-Reformation bishops

Church of Ireland succession

Roman Catholic succession

See also

 Waterford Cathedral
 Lismore Cathedral, Ireland

Notes

References

  
 
 

Religion in County Waterford
 Roman Catholic
Waterford and Lismore
 Bishop
Waterford and Lismore
 Church of Ireland
Lismore, County Waterford